The High Resolution Microwave Survey was a NASA project that was to scan ten million frequencies using radio telescopes. A decade in the making, the objective was to find transmissions from alien intelligences. The primary point of observation for the project was the Arecibo Ionospheric Observatory in Puerto Rico. The project began in October 1992 with SETI researcher Jill Tarter on board. However, one year later, first-term Nevada Senator Richard Bryan was responsible for removing funding for the project.

References

External links 
 The NASA High Resolution Microwave Survey
 BEACON eSpace at Jet Propulsion Laboratory: NASA's High Resolution Microwave Survey: The first Year of the Sky Survey
 Social implications of NASA’s high resolution microwave survey 
The Current State of Target Selection for NASA's High Resolution Microwave Survey

Search for extraterrestrial intelligence
NASA programs